Iceland's first ambassador to the Soviet Union was Pétur Benediktsson in 1944. Iceland's last ambassador to the Soviet Union was Ólafur Egilsson in 1991.

List of ambassadors

See also
Iceland–Soviet Union relations
Foreign relations of Iceland
Ambassadors of Iceland

References
List of Icelandic representatives (Icelandic Foreign Ministry website) 

1944 establishments
1991 disestablishments
Main
Soviet Union
Iceland